The 2001 Primera División Uruguaya was contested by 18 teams, and Nacional won the championship.

Group A

Group B

Group C

Overall

Champions

Apertura

Clausura

Playoff
 Nacional 2-2; 2-1 Danubio
Nacional won the championship.

Relegation group

Group A

Group B

References
 Uruguay - List of final tables (RSSSF)

Uruguayan Primera División seasons
Uru
2001 in Uruguayan football